Port Arthur may refer to: 

In China:
 Port Arthur, China, now called Lüshunkou District, in the city of Dalian
 Port Arthur massacre (China) in the Sino-Japanese War in 1894
 Battle of Port Arthur, a sea battle in the Russo-Japanese War in 1904
 Siege of Port Arthur, a land battle in 1904

In Australia:
 Port Arthur, Tasmania, the site of a historic convict settlement
 Port Arthur massacre (Australia), which occurred in Port Arthur, Tasmania in 1996
Port Arthur, South Australia, a locality

In the United States:
 Port Arthur, Texas, a city in the United States
 Port Arthur, Wisconsin, an unincorporated community

In Canada:
 Port Arthur, Ontario, a former city, now a part of Thunder Bay
 Port Arthur (electoral district)

In Finland:
 VIII District, Turku, a district in Turku

pt:Port Arthur